Shafiqul Islam Swapan is a Bangladeshi cinematographer. He won the Bangladesh National Film Award and Bachosas Award  for Best Cinematography twice, for the films Ghuddi (1980) and Nalish (1982).
His total film's are 
3) Padmaboti
4)Daku Morjina 
5)Teen Bahadur
6)Nieat
7)Usillah
8) Chandan Deeper Rajkonna
9)Ayna Bibir Pala

Selected films
 Ghuddi -  1980
 Nalish - 1982
 Chandon Diper Rajkonna - 1984

Awards and nominations
National Film Awards

References

External links
 
 

Bangladeshi cinematographers
Best Cinematographer National Film Award (Bangladesh) winners